The Dome of Yusuf is a free-standing domed structure on the Temple Mount, located south of the Dome of the Rock.

It was built by Saladin (born Yusuf) in the 12th century, and has been renovated several times. It bears inscriptions from the 12th and 17th centuries: one dated 1191 in Saladin's name, and two mentioning Yusuf Agha, possibly a governor of Jerusalem or a eunuch in the Ottoman imperial palace.

Description 
A rectangular semi-enclosed structure resembling an aedicule, the Dome of Yusuf sits upon a solid stone wall and is supported by three pointed open arches. On the northern face of the southern wall, there are stone carvings and a marble-faced blind niche. The exterior of the dome is covered in lead sheeting, and the interior is decorated with a ribbed pattern.

The structure has three inscriptions:
 The prominent inscription on the lower panel, a green naskh Arabic text, is from 1191 (during the Ayyubid dynasty). It calls Saladin by his kunya  ("father of the Triumphant") and his personal name . It also mentions an emir, al-Asfahasalar Sayf ad-Din Ali bin Ahmad (al-Asfahsalar Ali bin Ahmad al-Hikkari), for having supervised the construction of a defensive trench.
 Two small, unpainted inscriptions are on the façade's spandrels (above the arch). They are in two different languages, together forming a bilingual epigraphic text. Both panels end with "1092" in Eastern Arabic numerals, which is the Hijri year that overlaps partly with 1682 CE.
 The right one is in Ottoman Turkish, stating that Superintendent Ali Agha built this.
 The left is in Arabic, with mostly the same information. It indicates that Ali did it on behalf of Yusuf Agha. Both panels clarify that the reward for this effort should go to Yusuf.
The white central panel inside the niche is blank.

Environs 
It is one of several structures jutting out of the southern end of the raised platform (terrace) of the Dome of the Rock.  
The Dome of Yusuf is between the Summer Pulpit (Minbar of Burhān ad-Dīn) and the an-Naḥawiyya Dome (Grammarians' Dome).
To their east, one sees the main southern colonnade (mawāzīn).

The less-ornamental Dome of Yusuf Agha is a separate building, located in a plaza in the south of the compound.

References

External links
 
 360-degree view from under the dome
 A 19th-century map of the area. It is labelled lowercase n. The author, Ermete Pierotti, claims it was where Saladin prayed after winning the Siege of Jerusalem: "".

Ayyubid architecture in the State of Palestine
Yusuf, Dome of Yusuf